Rubén Antonio Benítez  (born 16 September 1972, in Usulutan) is a former Salvadoran sprinter who competed in the men's 100m competition at the 1996 Summer Olympics. He recorded a 10.74, not enough to qualify for the next round past the heats. His personal best is 10.35, set in 1998.

References

1972 births
Living people
Salvadoran male sprinters
Athletes (track and field) at the 1996 Summer Olympics
Olympic athletes of El Salvador
Central American Games gold medalists for El Salvador
Central American Games medalists in athletics
20th-century Salvadoran people